The 1983–84 Kansas Jayhawks men's basketball team represented the University of Kansas during the 1983–84 NCAA Division I men's basketball season.

Roster
Carl Henry
Kelly Knight
Calvin Thompson
Greg Dreiling
Ron Kellogg
Brian Martin
Mark Turgeon
Kerry Boagni
Mike Marshall
Tad Boyle
Cedric Hunter
Jeff Guiot
Tim Banks

Schedule

References

Kansas Jayhawks men's basketball seasons
Kansas
Kansas
Kansas Jay
Kansas Jay